Chinese Malay literature is the literature of Overseas Chinese in predominant Malay regions, especially Malaysia. It is written in a variety of languages including Malay, English, and Chinese dialects like Mandarin Chinese and Hokkien, and also creoles and mixed languages based on these.

References

See also
 Malaysian literature
 Indonesian literature
 Chinese literature
 Nanyang

 
Malaysian literature
Chinese diaspora
Chinese literature